John Arthur Edward Traill (1882–1958) was the first Irish–Argentine 10-goal polo player. 

He was born in 1882. He married Henrietta Margaret, from Scotland, and they had children John and James.

Traill owned a ranch in Argentina and imported polo ponies for the Roehampton Club,  training them in Richmond Park. He was also a coach at Ham Polo Club when it was revived by Billy Walsh. His name appears as winner of the Roehampton Trophy several times, alongside teammates such as the Marquess of Villavieja, Jack Nelson and Major Philip Magor.

Traill won the Argentine Open ten times during his career. 

He died in 1958.

References 

1882 births
1958 deaths
Argentine polo players
Irish polo players
Roehampton Trophy